What It Look Like may refer to:

"What It Look Like",  a song by Curren$y from the 2012 album The Stoned Immaculate
"What It Look Like",  a song by French Montana from the 2019 album Montana
"What It Look Like",  a song by Lil Debbie from the 2014 EP California Sweetheart